The 2017–18 Liga Leumit was the 19th season as second tier since its re-alignment in 1999 and the 76th season of second-tier football in Israel.

A total of sixteen teams were contesting in the league, including twelve sides from the 2016–17 season, the two promoted teams from 2016–17 Liga Alef and the two relegated teams from 2016–17 Israeli Premier League.

Changes from 2016–17 season

Team changes
Maccabi Netanya and Hapoel Acre, were promoted to the 2017–18 Israeli Premier League.

Hapoel Tel Aviv and Hapoel Kfar Saba were relegated after finishing as the two bottom-placed clubs in the 2016–17 Israeli Premier League.

Maccabi Sha'arayim, and Hapoel Jerusalem were directly relegated to Liga Alef after finishing in the previous season in last two league places. They were replaced the top placed teams from each division of 2016–17 Liga Alef, Hapoel Marmorek (from South Division) and Hapoel Hadera (from North Division).

Overview

Stadia and locations

The club is playing their home games at a neutral venue because their own ground does not meet league requirements.

Regular season

Regular season table

Results

Playoffs

Top Playoff
Key numbers for pairing determination (number marks position after 30 games)

Top Playoff table

Top Playoff results

Bottom Playoff
Key numbers for pairing determination (number marks position after 30 games)

Bottom Playoff table

Bottom Playoff results

Positions by round
The table lists the positions of teams after each week of matches. In order to preserve chronological evolvements, any postponed matches are not included to the round at which they were originally scheduled, but added to the full round they were played immediately afterwards. For example, if a match is scheduled for matchday 13, but then postponed and played between days 16 and 17, it will be added to the standings for day 17.

Source: IFA
Source:

Promotion/relegation playoff
The 14th-placed team, Hapoel Kfar Saba, faced 2017–18 Liga Alef promotion play-offs winner Ironi Tiberias in a two-legged tie. The matches took place on 25 and 29 May 2018.

Hapoel Kfar Saba won 5–3 on aggregate and remained in Liga Leumit. Ironi Tiberias remained in Liga Alef.

See also
 2017–18 Toto Cup Leumit

References

2017–18 in Israeli football leagues
Liga Leumit seasons
Isr